Hog may refer to:

Animals
 Pig
 Usually referring to the domestic pig
 Sometimes referring to other animals in the family Suidae, including:
 Warthog
 Red river hog
 Giant forest hog
 groundhog
 hedgehog
 hog (sheep), a yearling sheep, as yet unshorn

Other uses
 Harley-Davidson, a motorcycle manufacturer
 Harley Owners Group
 The Hogs (American football), a prior nickname for the offensive line of the Washington Redskins
 Hogging and sagging, a nautical term
 Hogging (sexual practice)
 Higher order grammar
 Histogram of oriented gradients, used in computer vision and image processing for the purpose of object detection
 House of Guitars
 Arkansas Razorbacks, the sports teams of the University of Arkansas
 Frank País Airport, IATA symbol HOG
 Hidden Object Game, a genre of casual puzzle games
 Hogarthian or Hog, a scuba diving gear configuration pioneered by William Hogarth Main

See also
 Sandhog, the slang term given to urban miners, construction workers who work underground
 Server hog, places excessive load on a server such that the server performance as experienced by other clients is degraded
 Water hog, a machine that removes water from sports grounds
 Pig (disambiguation)
 Boar (disambiguation)
 Swine (disambiguation)